Aulum or Avlum is a railway town situated between Holstebro and Herning in Region Midtjylland, with a population of 3,249 (1 January 2022). It was the main town and the municipal seat of the now abolished Aulum-Haderup Municipality.

Transportation

Aulum is located at the Vejle-Holstebro railway line and is served by Aulum railway station.

References

External links
Weather forecast Aulum, Denmark weather-atlas.com

Cities and towns in the Central Denmark Region
Herning Municipality